EngageMedia is a not-for-profit Video for Change organization that was co-founded by Anna Helme and Andrew Lowenthal in March 2005. The organisation focuses on creating social change through the distribution of human rights and environmental video, media and technology capacity building, research, network development and digital rights advocacy.

EngageMedia launched a video-sharing site in October 2006 based on a Free and Open Source Software platform it develops and maintains, called Plumi, originally developed by Dave Fregon, Andrew Nicholson, Anna Helme and Andrew Lowenthal.

In June 2006 EngageMedia collaborated with CandidaTV in Rome to put on Transmission at the Forte Prenestino social centre. Transmission was a global gathering of free software developers and video activists developing online video distribution tools for social justice and media democracy. The event in Rome was followed up by London, Re:Transmission, in October 2006, and Vx:Mission Amsterdam in January 2007.

In May 2008 a Transmission Asia-Pacific (TXAP) event was coordinated by EngageMedia and the Jakarta-based Ruangrupa near Sukabumi in West Java. The five-day event brought together 55 video activists and developers from 15 countries throughout the Asia-Pacific.

In May 2010 EngageMedia launched a new version of the Plumi video-sharing app, developed by Dimitris Moraitis, Markos Gogoulos, Christos Psaltis and Mike Muzurakis of Unweb.me, and project-managed by Anna Helme, in collaboration with EngageMedia.

In June 2012 EngageMedia and WITNESS co-founded the Video4Change Network, an alliance of video activism organisations from across the globe.

In October 2018, EngageMedia launched a new version of the Video4Change network website.

In February 2019, EngageMedia launched the Video4Change Impact Toolkit, a guide to creating impact video "designed for documentary or journalist video-makers, established Video for Change organisations, and nonprofit organisations that are using or thinking about using video to engage their communities". The toolkit uses illustrations by Lachlan Conn and was developed along with the new Video4Change site by Anna Helme.

EngageMedia maintains offices in Melbourne, Australia, and Yogyakarta, Indonesia, with other staff based regionally and globally.

In 2013 EngageMedia collaborated with the MIT Center for Civic Media and Open Documentary Lab to investigate the impact of Video for Change practices.

See also
 Media activism
 Internet activism
 Alternative media

References

 A Handbook for Coding Cultures
 Sustaining Autonomous Media Networks

External links
 EngageMedia.org: EngageMedia's organisational website
 the Video4Change Network established by EngageMedia and its partners

Non-profit organisations based in Victoria (Australia)
Information technology organizations based in Oceania
Digital rights organizations